Alkass Sports Channels is a group of ten sports channels that are broadcast 24/7 from Qatar. Its official name is Al Dawri wal Kass, since it was initially launched to broadcast domestic football in Qatar. The ten channels of Alkass are numbered from one to ten.

Starting from 2013, four of its ten channels (Al-Kass 3/6/7/8) are encrypted with Qatari pay-tv network beIN Channels Network,  which are specified to broadcasting matches of AFC Champions League and AFC Cup.Since January 2023, beIN Channels Network introduced 2 new encrypted channels (9/10).

History
Alkass Sports Channels was launched in June 2006 as the second sports channel from Qatar after Al Jazeera Sports. In its first year, the channel won many viewers with its unmatched coverage of domestic sports, especially football. It also broadcast the 2006 Asian Games held in Doha. It now also covers matches involving the Arabian Gulf countries, notably FIFA World Cup qualifying matches, the AFC Asian Cup and the Arabian Gulf Cup. It has emerged as one of the most popular sport channels in Arabia.

Al-Kass has now ten sports channel, four of them are FTA and the other six channels are encrypted with the Qatari pay-tv beIN Channels Network.

Programming

Football 
In September 2012, Alkass held the rights to broadcast the Qatar Stars League in English.

Football broadcasters

Events
Besides broadcasting, the channel has held certain sporting events in its history. A notable event is the Alkass International Cup. It is an under-17 tournament in which the best teams in the world send their youth teams to Qatar to participate in the tournament. Both, Qatar's Aspire International, and Aspire Qatar participated. The main purpose of the tournament is to help develop youth systems worldwide. There are cash prizes for the winners.

Awards
The channel won the best Persian Gulf Sports Channel award in 2007. Khalid Jassim, the host of the Majlis (The Council) programme won the best host award.

The channel also won two awards at the Promax BDA awards held at New York in June 2008.

References

External links
 Official website

1996 establishments in Qatar
Television channels and stations established in 1996
Arabic-language television
Television networks in Qatar
Sports mass media in the Middle East
Mass media in Doha